Ralph Joseph Falsetta (August 25, 1914 – May 13, 1999), also known as Big Ralph Falsetta, was an American politician. He served as a Democratic member for the 18th district of the Louisiana State Senate.

Falsetta was born in Donaldsonville, Louisiana, the son of Italian parents Rosa Regira and Anthony Falsetta. In 1975 Falsetta was elected for the 18th district of the Louisiana State Senate, serving until 1976. He served a second term from 1978 to 1980. Falsetta was mayor of Donaldsonville, Louisiana from 1981.

References 

1914 births
1999 deaths
People from Donaldsonville, Louisiana
Democratic Party Louisiana state senators
Mayors of places in Louisiana
20th-century American politicians
American people of Italian descent